Travaglia is an Italian surname. Notable people with the surname include:
Renato Travaglia (born 1965), Italian rally driver
Simon Travaglia, creator of the Bastard Operator From Hell
Stefano Travaglia (born 1991), Italian tennis player

See also
Travaglio
Valtravaglia

Italian-language surnames